Todos quieren con Marilyn is a Colombian telenovela original by Juan Carlos Perez Florez and produced by RCN Televisión. It stars Scarlet Ortiz as the titular character.

Cast

Main 
 Scarlet Ortiz as Marilyn
 Jorge Reyes as Juan Ignacio Camacho
 Cristina Umaña as Lorenza Pachón
 Alejandro López as Federico "Kiko" Arbeláez
 Marcela Mar as Johana / Brigitte
 César Mora as Benito
 Diego Trujillo as Gabriel Camacho

Recurring 

 Ana María Kámper as Piedad de Pachón
 Sandra Hernández as Gladys / Ingrid
 Andrés Suárez as Chucky
 Gerardo Calero as Enrique Pachón
 John Ceballos as Joaquín "Joaco"
 Mariangélica Duque as María Fernanda "Nani" Franco
 Patricia Polanco as Clemencia de Camacho
 Gustavo Ángel as Simón / Moncho
 Rafael Novoa as Rafael Ruiz Restrepo
 Ernesto Benjumea as David Londoño
 Toto Vega as Fredy Polanía
 Karem Escobar as Lady Estefany
 Sara Corrales as Catalina Osorio
 María Angélica Duque as María Fernanda "Nani" Franco
 Christian Ruiz as Benson Caicedo
 Sebastián Caicedo as Carlos Alberto "Beto" Camacho
 Indhira Serrano as Onix
 Marcela Posada as Yolanda
 Juan Miguel Marín as Tyson Corchuelo
 Nicolás Reyes as Tobías Rómulo Salcedo
 Helena Mallarino as  Dora Stella "Greta" Orjuela

References

External links 
 

2004 telenovelas
Colombian telenovelas
RCN Televisión telenovelas
Spanish-language telenovelas
2004 Colombian television series debuts
2005 Colombian television series endings
Television shows set in Colombia